is a Japanese actor.

Filmography

Film
Okoge (1992) – Tochihiko Terazaki
Kaettekita Kogarashi Monjirō (1993) - Hachibei
Godzilla 2000 (1999) – Takada
Godzilla Against Mechagodzilla (2002) – JXSDF Chief Ichiyanagi
Bayside Shakedown 2 (2003) – Sakakibara
Blue Swallow (2005) – The Minister for Foreign Affairs of Japan
Death Note (2006) – Matsubara
Map of the Sounds of Tokyo (2009) – Nagara
Isoroku (2011) – Chūichi Nagumo
The Floating Castle (2012) – Hōjō Ujimasa
Cape Nostalgia (2014) – Narumi
Assassination Classroom (2015) – Gōki Onaga 
Assassination Classroom: Graduation (2016) – Gōki Onaga
Musashi (2019) – Itakura Katsushige
Rurouni Kenshin: The Final (2021) – Maekawa Miyauchi
Familia (2023)

Television
Taiga drama
Homura Tatsu (1993–94) – Fujiwara no Motoaki
Tokugawa Yoshinobu (1998) – Umezawa Magotaro
Sanada Maru (2016) – Takanashi Naiki
Asadora
Himawari (1996)
Dondo Hare (2007) – Hideki Yamamuro
Sunshine (2011) – Shotaro Kamikura
Hanako and Anne (2014) – Heisuke Muraoka
Natsuzora: Natsu's Sky (2019)
Chimudondon (2022) – Tomohiro Ino
Shiroi Kyotō (2003, Fuji TV) – Professor Funao
Jyouou (2005, TV Tokyo) – Seiji Nakabō
Bloody Monday (2008, TBS) – Takao Sonoma
Zettai Reido (2010–11, Fuji TV) – Shintarō Shiraishi
Nankyoku Tairiku (2011, TBS) – Shinpei Hatano 
Hayami-san to Yobareru Hi (2012, Fuji TV) – Hiroshi Kanai
Nemuri Kyōshirō The Final (2018, Fuji TV) - Kunen
Shikatanakatta to Iute wa Ikan no desu (2021, NHK)

References

External links
 Official profile 
 

1951 births
Japanese male actors
Living people
People from Kumamoto Prefecture
Komazawa University alumni